The John Steel Singers were an Australian six-piece band from Brisbane, Queensland, named after a toy horse that band member Tim Morrissey named John Steel. They were formed in 2007 when Morrissey and Scott Bromiley decided to start making music together and were soon joined by Ross Chandler, Pete Bernoth, Pat McDermott and Luke McDonald (formerly of Sunk Loto) . The band released an EP and a mini album independently before signing with Levi's Jeans' record label Levity and releasing another EP, In Colour. The band has had multiple tracks on rotation on Triple J, won a Triple J Unearthed competition and became the Unearthed Artist of the Year in 2008. The band's song 'Overpass' placed 52nd in the 2010 Hottest 100.

Discography

Studio albums

EPs
The John Steel Singers (2007)
The Beagle and the Dove mini LP (2008)
In Colour (Levity, 2008)
Masochist (2009)

Band members
Final lineup
 Scott Bromiley – vocals, guitar, keyboards, trumpet, bass
 Tim Morrissey – vocals, guitar, keyboards
 Ross Chandler – drums
 Pete Bernoth – vocals, keyboards, trombone
 Luke McDonald – vocals, keyboards, guitar
 Jonathan Boulet – percussion
 Kirsty Tickle – saxophone, vocals

Former members
 Dion J. Forde – bass
 Damien Hammond – bass
 Pat McDermott – bass
 Conan Thorogood – bass

Awards

AIR Awards
The Australian Independent Record Awards (commonly known informally as AIR Awards) is an annual awards night to recognise, promote and celebrate the success of Australia's Independent Music sector.

|-
| AIR Awards of 2009
| The John Steel Singers
| Breakthrough Independent Artist
| 
|-

J Award
The J Awards are an annual series of Australian music awards that were established by the Australian Broadcasting Corporation's youth-focused radio station Triple J. They commenced in 2005.

|-
| J Awards of 2008
| The John Steel Singers
| Unearthed Artist of the Year
|

References

Musical groups from Brisbane
Australian indie rock groups
Musical groups established in 2007